Little Munden or Munden-Frewell or Munden Parva  is a civil parish in the East Hertfordshire district, in the county of Hertfordshire, England. In 2011 the parish had a population of 952.

The parish also includes the settlements of Dane End, Green End, Haultwick and Potter's Green.

The Parish Church of All Saints is Grade I listed and was restored in the 19th century. There are 36 listed buildings in Little Munden.

Little Munden was recorded in the Domesday Book as Mundane. The manor was held by Lewin before 1086.

See also
Little Munden Primary School
List of civil parishes in Hertfordshire
List of places in Hertfordshire

References

External links

Mundens.net
A Church Near You

Civil parishes in Hertfordshire
East Hertfordshire District